Oliver Welke (born 19 April 1966) is a German television presenter, journalist, satirist, comedian and voice actor.

Biography 
Welke was born in Bielefeld and studied journalism at the University of Münster, graduating in 1993. He then worked in a number of fields and eventually became a rather well-known sport journalist and presenter. Together with Oliver Kalkofe, whom he met while working for a public radio station, he provided the German voices for Mystery Science Theater 3000: The Movie (as Crow T. Robot) and the British comedy show Little Britain, and also co-wrote the script for the crime film parody Der WiXXer. Since May 2009, Welke has been the host of the satirical heute-show on German public broadcaster ZDF, which is commonly viewed as a German adaptation of The Daily Show.

Welke is married and has two sons. He is involved in several charities such as Terre des hommes.

Filmography 
 2004: Der WiXXer
 2006–2009: Schillerstraße (TV series)
 2007: Neues vom WiXXer
 2012: Götter wie Wir (TV series)

CDs 
 Kalk & Welk (together with Oliver Kalkofe), 2000, Frühstyxradio (Rough Trade Records)
 Kalk & Welk: Zwei Engel der Barmherzigkeit (together with Oliver Kalkofe), 2000, Frühstyxradio (Rough Trade Records)

Books 
 Der Wixxer (together with Bastian Pastewka and Oliver Kalkofe), 2007, Vgs, 
 heute-show: Das Buch (together with Morten Kühne), 2011, Rowohlt Verlag, 
 Frank Bsirske macht Urlaub auf Krk – Deutsche Helden privat (together with Dietmar Wischmeyer), 2013, Rowohlt Verlag,

Awards 
 2001: Deutscher Fernsehpreis (German Television Award)
 2004: German Comedy Award as part of team 7 Tage, 7 Köpfe
 2007: German Comedy Award as part of team Frei Schnauze XXL
 2009: German Comedy Award as part of team heute-show
 2010: Grimme Award as part of team heute-show
 2010: German Comedy Award as part of team heute-show
 2010: Deutscher Fernsehpreis in the category Best Comedy as part of team heute-show
 2011: German Comedy Award as part of team heute-show (best comedy show)
 2012: Hanns-Joachim-Friedrichs-Award for television journalism for him and his team of heute-show
 2012: German Comedy Award as part of team heute-show (best comedy show)
 2013: Bayerischer Fernsehpreis as presenter of the heute-show
 2014: Deutscher Fernsehpreis as presenter of the FIFA WM 2014, for the best sports telecast 2014: Bambi in the category Comedy for the heute-show 2014: Hans-Oelschläger-Preis for the heute-show''

References

External links 
 Official website
 Sueddeutsche: Oliver Welke im Gespräch: SchwarzGelb war bislang gut für uns
Oliver Welke in the German Dubbing Card Index

1966 births
Living people
German television presenters
German male voice actors
German male comedians
German sports broadcasters
German sports journalists
German male journalists
Actors from Bielefeld
University of Münster alumni
German male writers
ZDF people
Mass media people from Bielefeld